Mikhail Orlov may refer to:

 Mikhail Fyodorovich Orlov (1788–1842), Russian General-major and Decembrist
 Mikhail Orlov (racewalker) (born 1967), Russian race walker
 Mikhail Orlov (diplomat), Ambassador of the Soviet Union to Seychelles, 1981–1987
 Glenn Michael Souther, American defector to the Soviet Union who changed his name to Mikhail Yevgenyevich Orlov